Maamigili (Dhivehi: މާމިގިލި) Maamigili is the largest and most populous of the islands of Alif Dhaal Atoll which border the South Ari Marine Protected Area (MPA).

Geography
Unlike all the other islands in this chain, it is naturally round in shape, owing to its position on one of the edge of one of the widest channels in the MPA.

Demography

Economy
The main area of habitation is toward the eastern half of the island. A deep water access harbour leads toward the enormous main street, which runs east to west straight through the heart of the island. This busy street is full of different kinds of shops, with the tourist souvenir shops dominating the eastern end. Toward the western end of the street is a small mosque, the medical centre, the huge and very impressive school and the island council offices. There is a real feel of growth and development on this island, and in many ways it feels more like Male or an atoll capital island than the traditional quiet village that is seen nearby.

Adding to this sense of progress is the impossible to miss development of a huge new deep water harbour and airport complex. The traditional harbour has been expanded by several times its original size, and is now capable of accommodating 20 metre plus liveaboard vessels.

Transport

Ferry 
Maamigili is connected by ferry service from Malé.

Airport 
Villa International Airport Maamigili has been built on the southern edge of the island, the huge lagoon has been reclaimed, adding an area of over 73 hectares to the original island. This was done to construct the first airport in Ari atoll, with a plan to link into the network of larger capacity terrestrial landing planes, which are capable of reaching all parts of the country. The airport will also have a pilot training school. Progress on the construction of the airport is gathering pace, with regular flights being scheduled to begin by 2013.

Taxi 
The island has about five taxi cars and around three pickups as taxi for various purposes.

See also 
 Ariadhoo island close to Maamigili

References

Islands of the Maldives